Volker Ohl (born 27 April 1950) is a German former pole vaulter who competed in the 1972 Summer Olympics.

References

1950 births
Living people
West German pole vaulters
German male pole vaulters
Olympic athletes of West Germany
Athletes (track and field) at the 1972 Summer Olympics